Streptanthus albidus is a species of flowering plant in the mustard family known by the common name Metcalf Canyon jewelflower. It is endemic to California, where it is known only from the Central Coast Ranges and San Francisco Bay Area. It grows in open areas such as grasslands, often on serpentine soils.

Description
It is an annual herb producing an erect, usually branching stem up to a meter tall or slightly taller. There are bristly hairs around the base. The basal leaves are lance-shaped with toothed edges and are borne on winged petioles. Leaves farther up the stem are smaller and narrower, sometimes linear in shape, and toothed or smooth-edged. Flowers occur at intervals along the upper stem. Each has a spherical to  urn-shaped calyx of keeled sepals about a centimeter long with curving petals emerging from the tip. The calyx of sepals may be white to purple, depending on subspecies. The fruit is a long, narrow silique which may be 12 centimeters in length.

Subspecies
There are two subspecies, both rare. 
The rarer of the two, ssp. albidus, is federally listed as an endangered species of the United States. It is endemic to Santa Clara County, where it is known from nine recent occurrences. This subspecies has white or green-tinged sepals. 
The other subspecies, ssp. peramoenus, the most beautiful jewelflower or uncommon jewelflower, is known from several locations in the Bay Area and several near San Luis Obispo. It has pale to dark purple sepals and purplish petals.

References

External links
Jepson Manual Treatment
Photo gallery: ssp. albidus
Photo gallery: ssp. peramoenus

albidus
Endemic flora of California
Natural history of the California chaparral and woodlands
Natural history of the San Francisco Bay Area
Natural history of Santa Clara County, California